Vander Luiz Silva Souza (born 17 April 1990 in Salvador), simply known as Vander, is a Brazilian footballer who plays for Bangkok United as a winger or an attacking midfielder.

Career

Career statistics
(Correct )

according to combined sources on the Flamengo official website and Flaestatística.

Honours

Club
Flamengo
Taça Guanabara: 2011
Taça Rio: 2011
Campeonato Carioca: 2011

Bahia
Campeonato Baiano: 2012

Vitória
Campeonato Baiano: 2013, 2016

Chiangrai United
 Thai FA Cup: 2017

Notes

References

External links
 
Player Profile @Flamengo.com.br 
Player Profile @Flapédia 

1990 births
Living people
Sportspeople from Salvador, Bahia
Brazilian footballers
Association football midfielders
Campeonato Brasileiro Série A players
Campeonato Brasileiro Série B players
Esporte Clube Bahia players
CR Flamengo footballers
Esporte Clube Vitória players
Associação Portuguesa de Desportos players

Association football forwards